Cossulus zoroastres is a moth in the family Cossidae. It is found in Iran.

References

Natural History Museum Lepidoptera generic names catalog

Cossinae
Moths described in 1902
Moths of Asia